The Kazakhstan Professional Football League (Qazaqstan Premer Ligasy), commonly referred to as Kazakh Premier League  or simply Premier League, is the top division of football in Kazakhstan. The League is controlled by the Football Federation of Kazakhstan and was set up in 1992. The League is fed into by the First Division and starts in spring and finishes in late autumn because of the low temperatures in the winter, with each championship corresponding to a calendar year. The majority of matches have been played at weekends in recent seasons.

Name changes
Top Division (1992–2001)
Super League (2002–2007)
Premier League (2008–present)

Current clubs 
The following teams are competing in the 2021 season:

Soviet winners of republican level
Note that some teams such as Kairat Almaty participated in the upper leagues of the Soviet annual football competition. There was no solidly established independent Kazakh championship and the republican winner was conditionally picked by the Football Federation of Kazakh SSR. Since 1936 there was taken places republican football competition among sports societies and agencies and later among "collectives of physical culture" (CPhC → KFK). Since 1980 champion of the Soviet Kazakhstan was also awarded to "teams of masters" (professional teams) competing in football competitions of the Soviet Second League. 

1936 : Alma-Aty City
1937 : Dinamo Alma-Ata
1938 : Dinamo Alma-Ata
1939–45 : No Championship
1946 : Dinamo Alma-Ata
1947 : Lokomotiv Jambul
1948 : Trudovye Rezervy Alma-Ata
1949 : Dinamo Karaganda
1950 : Alma-Aty City
1951 : Meliorator Chimkent
1952 : Meliorator Chimkent
1953 : Meliorator Chimkent
1954 : Dinamo Alma-Ata
1955 : Dinamo Alma-Ata
1956 : Alma-Aty City
1957 : Stroitel Alma-Ata
1958 : Spartak Alma-Ata
1959 : Spartak Alma-Ata
1960 : Yenbek Guryev

1961 : Avangard Petropavlovsk
1962 : ADK Alma-Ata
1963 : Tselinnik Semipalatinsk
1964 : ADK Alma-Ata
1965 : ADK Alma-Ata
1966 : Aktyubinets Aktyubinsk
1967 : Torpedo Kokchetav
1968 : Gornyak Jezkangan
1969 : Shakhtyor Saran'
1970 : Stroitel Temir-Tau
1971 : Yenbek Jezkangan
1972 : Traktor Pavlodar
1973 : Yenbek Jezkangan
1974 : Gornyak Nikol'sky
1975 : Meliorator Chimkent
1976 : Khimik Stepnogorsk
1977 : Khimik Stepnogorsk
1978 : Trud Shevchenko
1979 : Khimik Stepnogorsk

1980 : Meliorator Chimkent
1981 : Burevestnik Kustanay
Zone 7 (3rd level, included teams from other republics)
1980 : Traktor Pavlodar
1981 : Aktyubinets Aktyubinsk
Zone 8 (3rd level)
1982 : Shakhtyor Karaganda
1983 : Shakhtyor Karaganda
1984 : Tselinnik Tselinograd
1985 : Meliorator Chimkent
1986 : Meliorator Chimkent
1987 : Meliorator Chimkent
1988 : Traktor Pavlodar
1989 : Traktor Pavlodar
Zone 8 (4th level)
1990 : Vostok Ust'-Kamenogorsk
1991 : Aktyubinets Aktyubinsk

Sources:
 Kazakhstan – List of Champions. RSSSF
 The Kazakh SSR Football Championship (Чемпионат Казахской ССР). Footballfacts. 
 The Kazakh SSR Football Championship D2 (Чемпионат Казахской ССР D2). Footballfacts.

Best teams in republican competitions

 7 – Meliorator Chimkent (1951, 1952, 1953, 1975, 1985, 1986, 1987)

 5 – Dinamo Alma-Ata (1937, 1938, 1946, 1954, 1955)

 4 – Traktor Pavlodar (1972, 1980, 1988, 1989)

 2 – Alma-Ata {collective city team} (1936, 1950, 1956)
 3 – ADK Alma-Ata (1962, 1964, 1965)
 3 – Khimik Stepnogorsk (1976, 1977, 1979)
 3 – Yenbek Jezkangan (1968, 1971, 1973)
 3 – Aktyubinets Aktyubinsk (1966, 1981, 1991)

 2 – Spartak Alma-Ata (1958, 1959)
 2 – Shakhter Karaganda (1982, 1983)

 1 – Lokomotiv Jambul (1947)
 1 – Trudovye Rezervy Alma-Ata (1948)
 1 – Dinamo Karaganda (1949)
 1 – Stroitel Alma-Ata (1957)
 1 – Yenbek Guryev (1960)
 1 – Avangard Petropavlovsk (1961)
 1 – Tselinnik Semipalatinsk (1963)
 1 – Torpedo Kokchetav (1967)
 1 – Shakhter Saran (1969)
 1 – Stroitel Temir-Tau (1970)
 1 – Gornyak Nikol'sky (1974)
 1 – Trud Shevchenko (1978)
 1 – Tselinnik Tselinograd (1984)
 1 – Vostok Ust'-Kamenogorsk (1990)

Kazakhstan League Seasons

Notes:
 Historical names shown in brackets according to the season.
 Best Player Award by FFK (1992–2005, 2008, 2010–) and GOAL Journal (2006–2007, 2009).

List of champions

Notes
 Italics identifies either defunct or teams that lost professional status.

Performance by club

All time top scorers

See also
Football in Kazakhstan
Sports league attendances

References

External links
Official website (archived 31 March 2019)

 
1
Top level football leagues in Europe